Mancosu is a surname. Notable people with the surname include:

Marcello Mancosu (born 1992), Italian footballer
Marco Mancosu (born 1988), Italian footballer
Matteo Mancosu (born 1984), Italian footballer, brother of Marco and Marcello

See also
Mancuso